Hudson's Bay High School is a public high school in the Central Park area of Vancouver, Washington, and is part of Vancouver Public Schools.  It was founded in 1955 and was named after the Hudson's Bay Company (HBC), as Fort Vancouver had been chosen, in 1821, as the HBC base of operations on the Pacific Slope. Hudson's Bay is known for having two strong magnet programs, as well as a children's day care and district-wide mothers' transportation program. It is located across from Clark College, where many Bay students participate in the Running Start program.

Magnet Programs
Hudson's Bay offers two magnet programs—Careers in Education, and Habitat and Civil Engineering.

Careers in Education
The Careers in Education magnet program prepares students for future careers in the fields of child development, family psychology, teaching, and instructional theory. Students take courses focused on these topics, and apply their learning through direct interaction with infants and children.

Habitat and Civil Engineering
The Habitat and Civil Engineering magnet is a four-year program that offers in-depth education to those students planning careers in urban horticulture, landscaping, ecology, Urban planning, Civil engineering, and Architecture. Students apply their learning working in Hudson Bay's horticulture center, nursery, and science park, and through internships and work experience.

Sports
Hudson's Bay is a member of the Washington Interscholastic Activities Association (WIAA) and participates in the Greater St. Helens 2A league.

State championships
 Boys Basketball: 1964
 Boys Tennis: 2003
 Boys Track: 1961
 Girls Tennis: 1971

Notable alumni
Chantelle Anderson— former WNBA player.
Kerry Brady— former NFL player
Charissa Chamorro—actress.
Tina Ellertson— former defender on the United States Women's National Soccer Team.
Chris Gissell, former MLB player (Colorado Rockies).
Robert F. Jeaudoin, professional wrestler under the ring name Bobby Jaggers
C. S. Lee — actor.
David Wood—former NBA player.
Nadine Woodward, journalist and Mayor of Spokane, Washington

References

External links
 Hudson's Bay High School website
 GSHL Football - Hudson's Bay High School
 OSPI school report card 2012-13

High schools in Vancouver, Washington
Public high schools in Washington (state)
Magnet schools in Washington (state)
Educational institutions established in 1955
1955 establishments in Washington (state)